Normandy Schools Collaborative (formerly the Normandy School District) is a public school district serving 23 municipalities in northern St. Louis County, Missouri. The district operates one comprehensive high school which includes an alternative education program, five grade 1-8 elementary schools, and one early learning center (for pre-school, pre-kindergarten, and kindergarten students). The district is named for Normandy, Missouri, one of the primary municipalities served by the district. The Missouri Board of Education voted to end the school district on June 30, 2014. It lost state accreditation that year for poor academic performance. An appointed board replaced the elected board, and the district became a new entity called the “Normandy Schools Collaborative.” The state had direct oversight of the schools. The District was featured on an episode of NPR's This American Life that aired on July 31, 2015.

History
The first recorded account of the schools in Normandy is found in the minutes of the Board of Directors of Schools dated July 12, 1894.  It was then a three-director rural district with three public schools already in operation. It was known as District No. 2, Township 46, Range 6 East, Eden, St. Louis County, Missouri. The first school built was Washington School, constructed in 1894 on one acre in the northeast corner of what is now Valhalla Cemetery.  Since that first school, the district grew to nine schools which included Normandy High School, Normandy Junior High/Middle (and later 7th-8th Grade Center), in addition to the elementary schools. The district would later add an Early Childhood Center to its offerings.

Normandy Schools (1894-present) 
Washington School - 1894
Washington School - 1930
Roosevelt School - 1897-1938
Lincoln School - est. 1900
Garfield School - 1906
McKinley School - 1907
Harrison School - 1907
Bel-Nor School - 1926
Jefferson School - 1929
Bel-Ridge School - 1953
Pine Lawn School - 1971
Normandy Junior High School - 1949
Washington High School - 1907
Normandy High School - 1925
Lucas Crossing School Complex - 2004
Barack Obama School - 2010
Normandy Early Learning Center - 2019
Currently operating as schools. 

Normandy School District maintained a stellar reputation throughout most of the 20th century, but was negatively affected in the 1970s and 1980s when, as was the case in many major cities in the midwest, factories began to close and residents were unable to maintain their working/middle-class salaries. The area was also impacted by white flight, when many of the Caucasian residents fled the inner-ring suburban area for locales further west and south. The reduction of industry, businesses and homeowners took a toll on the district and the surrounding municipalities. The changes in the demographics and economy also had a negative effect on the finances. 

In 2010, Normandy School District absorbed the failed Wellston School District under orders of the Missouri Board of Education. Prior to its absorption by the Normandy School District, the Wellston district had about 600 students, one high school, one middle school, and one elementary school. All three schools closed at the end of the 2009–2010 school year.

In September 2012, the Missouri Board of Education voted to remove accreditation from Normandy School District due to ongoing academic issues. Superintendent Stanton Lawrence was angered by the decision, given the district's willingness to absorb Wellston School District in 2010. Lawrence announced his resignation shortly after the state decision. On March 7, 2013, the Normandy School Board selected Tyrone McNichols, an administrator in the Hazelwood School District, as its new superintendent of schools.

In May 2013, discipline incident rates at Normandy High School were the second-highest among all schools in the state and the highest in Greater St. Louis.

The Normandy School Board voted on October 24, 2013 to close Bel-Nor Elementary School and lay off more than 100 teachers in response to the district's ongoing financial problems, a move that would save the district about $3 million. The Board also voted to stop paying tuition and transportation costs for students who transferred from the district (about $1.3 million to 14 districts in Greater St. Louis). Several Missouri legislators, including those who represent districts that include school districts that received students from Normandy, began pressuring the Missouri Board of Education to take over the Normandy School District. On October 26, 2013, Missouri Education Commissioner Chris Nicastro noted that the State Board of Education is examining the possibility of removing the local Normandy School Board from power, which it did on May 20, 2014, after over $8 million in transportation and tuition expenses for children in 20 other school districts left the District almost insolvent. The District sued Missouri the next day, charging there was as much as $10,000 per child spent over the actual cost of the transfer, which has been for approximately 1,000 students.

Educational and financial crisis
At the beginning of the 2013–2014 school year, Normandy School District had 4,590 students. 97% of Normandy students are black, 1.4% are white, and 1.1% are Hispanic. 91.7% of students receive free or reduced price lunches. The district did not make adequate yearly progress toward state goals in communication arts, mathematics, graduation rate, or attendance rate for 2011.

The August 2014 performance report from Missouri Department of Elementary and Secondary Education lists Normandy School District as the worst-performing district in the state. The district earned only seven of the 50 points possible on the assessment, an almost 4% drop from the previous year.

In 2014 the NSD had five million dollars in debts, and paid lobbyist Andy Blunt $135,000 to seek bailout funds from the state legislature of Missouri.

Schools
As of 2013-2014, the Normandy School District operated one high school, Normandy High School. The district also operated several other schools, including:

Normandy High School
Bel-Nor Ele-Middle School
Barack Obama Ele-Middle School
Jefferson Ele-Middle School
Lucas Crossing Ele-Middle School
Washington Ele-Middle School
Normandy Early Childhood/Kindergarten Complex
Normandy Alternative Learning Center (CASA)

A New Start
In 2014, the Missouri Department of Elementary and Secondary Education declared the Normandy School District as unaccredited and re-established the district as the Normandy Schools Collaborative. The new entity struggled financially and academically those first few years. However, the new district began to make gains on the Missouri Annual Performance Report.

References

External links
 Official website for the Normandy Schools Collaborative (formerly Normandy School District)
 [https://www.bizjournals.com/stlouis/news/2017/12/01/normandy-schools-granted-provisional-accreditation.html  Normandy schools granted provisional accreditation at St. Louis Business Journal
 [http://www.stlamerican.com/news/local_news/normandy-schools-gain-provisional-accreditation-after-nearly-years/article_90957f94-d6c9-11e7-92a6-6f79d9ab35eb.html  Normandy schools gain provisional accreditation after nearly 6 years at St. Louis American Dec. 7, 2017
 [http://www.stltoday.com/news/local/education/normandy-schools-get-good-news----and-provisional/article_693d9b70-e821-5b76-9709-ca2e1c9d2901.html  Normandy schools get good news — and provisional accreditation at St. Louis Post-Dispatch Dec. 1, 2017
 Profile on Normandy School District's chronic performance problems at This American Life

School districts in Missouri
Education in St. Louis County, Missouri
School districts established in 1894